Ilana Cohen (born 16 November 1943) is a former Israeli politician who served as a member of the Knesset for One Nation and the Labor Party from 2003 until 2006.

Biography
Born in Iraq, Cohen made aliyah in 1949. She worked as a nurse, and chaired the Nurses' Union.

In 2003 she was elected to the Knesset on the One Nation list. In 2005 the party merged into the Labor Party. She lost her seat in the 2006 elections, having decided to retire from politics.

References

External links
 

1943 births
Iraqi Jews
Israeli nurses
Women members of the Knesset
Living people
Israeli Labor Party politicians
One Nation (Israel) politicians
Iraqi emigrants to Israel
Members of the 16th Knesset (2003–2006)
21st-century Israeli women politicians